Parameta is a genus of African long-jawed orb-weavers that was first described by Eugène Louis Simon in 1895. , it is monotypic, being represented by a single species, '''Parameta jugularis.

See also
 List of Tetragnathidae species

References

External links 

Tetragnathidae
Araneomorphae genera
Spiders of Africa